Assaf Lowengart (born March 1, 1998) is an Israeli baseball player. He is a shortstop for the Mansfield Mountaineers in the Pennsylvania State Athletic Conference. He also plays for Team Israel, and most notably for Team Israel in the 2020 Summer Olympics. He is slated to play for Team Israel in the 2023 World Baseball Classic in Miami, in March 2023.

Early life
He is the son of Oded Lowengart and Ayelet Lowengart. His hometown is Timorim, Israel. He attended high school in Be'er Tuvia Regional Council. He then served in the Israel Defense Forces.

College
In 2020, Lowengart attended SUNY Sullivan Community College in New York State. He also played for Team Misgav in Israel in 2020.

In 2021, Lowengart attended Mansfield University of Pennsylvania in Pennsylvania. He played shortstop for the Mansfield Mountaineers in the Pennsylvania State Athletic Conference. In 2021, he batted .290/.394/.645 with 11 home runs (3rd in the conference) and 26 RBIs in 107 at bats.

In 2022, he again played for Mansfield.  He batted .356/.419/.678 with 19 doubles (5th in the conference), 11 home runs (9th), and 45 RBIs (10th) in 174 at bats, while playing 27 games in center field, 14 games at shortstop, 4 games at third base, and one game each in left field and right field. He was named Pennsylvania State Athletic Conference (PSAC) Eastern Division 2nd-Team Utility Player by the conference coaches.

Team Israel
Lowengart competed on the Israel national baseball team for qualification for the 2020 Olympics. He also played for the team at the Africa/Europe 2020 Olympic Qualification tournament in Italy in September 2019, which Israel won to qualify to play baseball at the 2020 Summer Olympics in Tokyo.

He will play for Team Israel again in the 2023 World Baseball Classic, to be held in Miami starting during March 11–15. Lowengart will be playing for Team Israel manager Ian Kinsler, and alongside two-time All Star outfielder Joc Pederson, starting pitcher Dean Kremer, and others.

References

External links

1989 births
Living people
20th-century Israeli military personnel
Israeli baseball players
Israeli Jews
Jewish baseball players
2019 European Baseball Championship players
Mansfield Mounties baseball players
Baseball players at the 2020 Summer Olympics
Olympic baseball players of Israel